Club Polideportivo Amanecer is a Spanish football team based in Sierra de Fuentes, in the autonomous community of Extremadura. Founded in 1970, it plays in Tercera División – Group 14, holding home games at Campo Municipal San Isidro.

Season to season

 4 seasons in Tercera División

External links
 fexfutbol.com profile 
 Futbolme.com profile

Football clubs in Extremadura
Association football clubs established in 1970
Divisiones Regionales de Fútbol clubs
1970 establishments in Spain